The BK 27 (also BK27 or BK-27) (German abbreviation for Bordkanone, "on-board cannon") is a  caliber revolver cannon manufactured by Mauser (now part of Rheinmetall) of Germany. It was developed in the late 1960s for the MRCA (Multi Role Combat Aircraft) program that ultimately became the Panavia Tornado.

The BK 27 is a gas-operated cannon firing a series of 27×145 mm cartridges with a typical projectile weight of 260 g (9.2 oz), and a total weight for the complete round of 516 g (1.14 lb). Most models use a linked feed system for the ammunition; however, the Eurofighter Typhoon makes use of a specially developed variant of the BK 27 that uses a linkless feed system instead, which is intended to improve reliability.

Design
The Mauser BK 27 is used in the Panavia Tornado, the Alpha Jet, the JAS 39 Gripen, and the Eurofighter Typhoon. At one time Lockheed Martin was considering a licensed-built version for the F-35 Lightning II.

Rheinmetall has also developed remote controlled naval versions, the MN 27 GS and the MLG 27 fully automatic naval guns, which are installed on many ships of the German Navy. Ninety-nine MLG 27s have been ordered by the German Navy so far. The cannon is a single-barrel, high performance, breech-cylinder gun operated by a fully automatic electrically fired gas-operated system at a selective rate of 1000 or 1700 rounds per minute(+/− 100 rpm). The Mauser BK 27 utilizes pyrotechnic cocking charges to cycle the action.

The gun mainly fires mine shells as these have the best effect against aircraft, there are also several types of armor piercing shells like the frangible armour piercing shell named Fap 27 mm x 145 mm ammunition/peb327 (DM103).

Operators

Current operators 

 Algerian Navy

 Austrian Air Force: Eurofighter

 Brazilian Air Force: Gripen

 Royal Brunei Navy

 Cameroon Air Force: Alpha Jet

 Discovery Air Defence Services: Alpha Jet

 Czech Air Force: Gripen

 German Air Force: Panavia Tornado, Eurofighter
 German Navy: MLG 27

 Hungarian Air Force: Gripen

 Italian Air Force: Panavia Tornado, Eurofighter

 Royal Saudi Air Force: Panavia Tornado, Eurofighter

 South African Air Force: Gripen

 Spanish Air Force: Eurofighter

 Swedish Air Force (under the designation 27 mm automatkanon m/85, 27 mm akan m/85): Gripen

 Royal Thai Air Force: Alpha Jet, Gripen

 United Arab Emirates Navy

 Royal Air Force: Eurofighter

Former operators 

 Portuguese Air Force: Alpha Jet

 Royal Air Force: Panavia Tornado
 QinetiQ: Alpha Jet

Specifications

Data from Jane's Information Group
 Type: single-barrel, five chamber revolver cannon
 Caliber: 27 mm × 145 (1.063 in)
 Operation: revolver
 Length: 2.31 m (7 ft 7 in)
 Weight (complete): 100 kg (220 lb)
 Rate of fire: 1,000-1,700 rpm selectable (+/− 100 rpm)
 Muzzle velocity: 1,100 m/s (3,600 ft/s)
 Muzzle energy: ~157,300 Joules
 Projectile weight: 260 g (9.2 oz)

See also
 ADEN cannon – comparable British design
 DEFA cannon – comparable French design
 R-23 cannon – comparable Russian design
 M39 cannon – comparable US design
 Oerlikon KBA - comparable Swiss design

References
Notes

External links
 Website of Rheinmetall Defence 
 Marineleichtgeschütz MLG 27 (Website from constructor)
 Mauser BK 27 on WaffenHQ
 Webseite of the EF2000
 RAF page on BK 27

Autocannon
Aircraft guns
Cold War weapons of Germany
BK-27
27 mm artillery
Mauser firearms
Military equipment introduced in the 1970s